Denmark competed at the 1994 Winter Paralympics in Lillehammer, Norway. 3 competitors from Denmark won 3 medals, 1 gold and 2 bronze, and finished 16th in the medal table.

See also 
 Denmark at the Paralympics
 Denmark at the 1994 Winter Olympics

References 

Denmark at the Paralympics
1994 in Danish sport
Nations at the 1994 Winter Paralympics